Richard Eric Glazbrook (born 8 February 1940) was an Australian politician who represented the South Australian House of Assembly seat of Brighton from 1979 to 1982 for the Liberal Party.

References

 

Members of the South Australian House of Assembly
Liberal Party of Australia members of the Parliament of South Australia
1940 births
Living people